Brian Francis Gibson  (4 November 1936 – 15 August 2017) was an Australian politician and businessman who held senior appointments in Australian companies and industry bodies.

Gibson had a career in business that included being Managing Director of Australian Newsprint Mills Ltd from 1980 to 1983, and Chair of what was then the Hydro-Electric Commission of Tasmania from 1989 to 1993. He was also National President of the forest industry peak representative body, the National Association of Forest Industries, from 1987 to 1991.

Gibson was elected to the Australian Senate at the 1993 election, as a member of the Liberal Party of Australia representing the state of Tasmania. After the 1996 election, Gibson was appointed as Parliamentary Secretary to the Treasurer. However, following concerns raised regarding a conflict of interest, he lost the portfolio from 15 October 1996 and did not hold a further ministerial position.

Gibson was re-elected in the 1998 election for a second six-year term, but resigned from parliament on 22 February 2002, having indicated to his party some months previously that he wished to move on to other things.

After resigning from parliament, Gibson was a board member of Concept Systems, a payroll and human resource management company; Director of the Tasmanian Advisory Board of the AMP Society; Australian Government nominated director to the Board of the Australian Stem Cell Centre; director of the Australian National Maritime Museum, and several other companies.

Gibson was appointed a Member of the Order of Australia in June 1988, and received the Centenary Medal in 2000.

Gibson died from cancer on 15 August 2017 at the age of 80.

References

1936 births
2017 deaths
Members of the Australian Senate for Tasmania
Members of the Order of Australia
Recipients of the Centenary Medal
Liberal Party of Australia members of the Parliament of Australia
Deaths from cancer in Tasmania
21st-century Australian politicians
20th-century Australian politicians
20th-century Australian businesspeople
21st-century Australian businesspeople
People from Ascot Vale, Victoria
Businesspeople from Melbourne
Politicians from Melbourne
University of Melbourne alumni
People educated at St Patrick's College, Ballarat
Businesspeople in forest products companies